The 1955 Lamar Tech Cardinals football team was an American football team that represented Lamar State College of Technology—now known Lamar University–as a member of the Lone Star Conference (LSC) during the 1955 college football season. Led by third-year head coach James B. Higgins, the Cardinals compiled an overall record of 4–6 with a mark of 2–4 in conference play, tying for fourth place in the LSC.

Schedule

References

Lamar
Lamar Cardinals football seasons
Lamar Tech Cardinals football